Torp Köpcentrum is a shopping mall located next to the highway (E6), about seven kilometres northwest of Uddevalla. Torp has currently around 69 shops, 700 employees and 3700 free parking spaces. Torp shopping mall owned by Steen & Strøm Sweden AB, a subsidiary of the Norwegian retail and real estate company Steen & Strøm.

Information
Establishment year 1991
Expansion 1998 Trade trade
Expansion 2000 Bauhaus
Extension 2001 Western Torp
Extension 2006 auto parts store, plantation
Number of shops 82
Number of parking spaces 3 700
Number of employees approx. 800

Trade surfaces gross
Konsumentföreningen Bohuslän-Älvsborg 14 000 m2
ICA 6 000 m2
Trade trade 20 700 m2
McDonald 's/Preem 800 m2
Bauhaus 9 500 m2
West Torp 15 000 m2
Biltema, Plantagen 11 000 m2
A total of 77 000 m2

Sales and visitor development Year Turnover Million gross Visit thousand

Torp shopping centre is a regional shopping centre
located 7 miles north of Uddevalla, Västra Götaland County, Sweden.
Property owner: Steen & Strøm Sweden AB, ICA and
Konsum Bohuslän-Älvsborg and others.

The following stores are at Torp

See also 
 List of shopping centres in Sweden

External links 

 Torp shopping mall
 Östra Torp owned by Ikea and also Ikano Retail Centres  shopping mall

Shopping centres in Sweden
Buildings and structures in Västra Götaland County